A. G. S. Ram Babu (16 July 1962 – 11 January 2022) was an Indian politician.

Biography
He was elected to the Lok Sabha from Madurai constituency as an Indian National Congress candidate in 1989 and 1991 elections, and as a Tamil Maanila Congress (Moopanar) candidate in 1996 election.

Ram Babu died from COVID-19 in Chennai on 11 January 2022, at the age of 59.

References 

1962 births
2022 deaths
Date of birth missing
India MPs 1989–1991
India MPs 1991–1996
India MPs 1996–1997
Deaths from the COVID-19 pandemic in India
Indian National Congress politicians from Tamil Nadu
Lok Sabha members from Tamil Nadu
Politicians from Madurai
Tamil Maanila Congress politicians